The 20th Annual Motul Petit Le Mans was the 2017 edition of the Petit Le Mans automotive endurance race, held on October 4–7, 2017, at the Road Atlanta circuit in Braselton, Georgia, United States. It was the 12th and final race of the 2017 WeatherTech SportsCar Championship, and the fourth Petit Le Mans run since the formation of the WeatherTech SportsCar Championship in 2014.

Qualifying
Provisional pole positions in each class are denoted in bold.  All Prototype and Prototype Challenge cars were grouped together on the starting grid, regardless of qualifying position.

Results
Class winners are denoted in bold and with

References

External links

Petit Le Mans
Petit Le Mans
Petit Le Mans
Petit Le Mans